The Marauders refers to one of two teams of fictional characters appearing in American comic books published by Marvel Comics. The original Marauders team included mutant warriors and assassins employed by the X-Men's enemy Mister Sinister, a mad scientist villain often intent on creating a perfect race of superhumans. At different times, the Marauders have been tasked with Sinister to perform kidnappings, assassinations, mass murder, or to simply fight Sinister's enemies. At different times, Marauders have been killed in combat, but often Mr. Sinister later uses his cloning technology to re-create them. This team of Marauders has appeared in many different stories of the X-Men franchise, as well as stories featuring other Marvel Comics heroes.

In 2019, the Dawn of X event involved the X-Men and many allies and enemies creating a new all-mutant country on the living island Krakoa. Teleport gates that only work for mutants were then created at various points on Earth, allowing any mutant who wished to join the new community to instantly do so. Kitty Pryde then formed a new team of "Marauders" to transport mutants to Krakoa who lived in countries that did not recognize the sovereignty of the mutant nation and/or obstructed the local teleport gates leading to the island. This team also works to protect mutant travelers and refugees from threats. The team's series Marauders debuted in 2019.

Publication history
The first Marauders team debuted in The Uncanny X-Men #210 (Oct. 1986), during a crossover called the "Mutant Massacre" where the team were sent to slaughter a community of sewer-dwelling mutants called Morlocks. This issue introduced the characters Arclight, Harpoon, Malice, Scalphunter, Scrambler, and Riptide. With the exception of Malice, these characters only appeared in issue #210 as figures in silhouette, but then made their full debut in the following issue The Uncanny X-Men #211. Two other Marauders known as Blockbuster and Prism made their first appearance in a later chapter of the "Mutant Massacre" featured in X-Factor #10. The original Marauders team also included the villains Sabretooth and Vertigo, but each had actually been introduced into comics years earlier, while the rest of the Marauders were created for the "Mutant Massacre" story by writer Chris Claremont and artist John Romita Jr. Vertigo had originally been introduced in Marvel Fanfare #1 (1982), while Sabretooth had debuted as an Iron Fist villain in Iron Fist #14 (1977) and then made appearances in Spider-Man stories before it was decided to make him a Marauder and bring him into the X-Men franchise. "Mutant Massacre" was the first story to hint at a connection between Sabretooth and the X-Man called Wolverine.

In The Uncanny X-Men #212, Mr. Sinister is mentioned as the employer of the Marauders. He is seen in silhouette in The Uncanny X-Men #213 (1986) when Sabretooth's mind is scanned. He does not appear with the team (or debut in comics) until The Uncanny X-Men #221 (1987). Although it is Sinister's team, it is later revealed in The Uncanny X-Men #350 (1997) that with the exception of Sabretooth and Scalphunter (whom had already worked for Sinister many times), it was the mutant thief (and later X-Men member) Gambit who recruited and organized the team. Gambit was unaware of the team's true purpose, using his skills to locate the members in exchange for Sinister helping him. Gambit is also said to be the one who led the Marauders to the Morlocks location, but this seems to contradict scenes in "Mutant Massacre" where the team tracks a young Morlock returning home.

During "Mutant Massacre," three Marauders are killed: Blockbuster The Mighty Thor #374, Riptide in The Uncanny X-Men #211, and Prism in X-Factor #10. However, all three appeared alive and well two years later during the 1989 "Inferno" crossover issues The Uncanny X-Men #240. Five years later, X-Men #34 (1994) revealed that Sinister regularly clones dead Marauders so they can serve him again. Gambit vol. 3 #8 (1999) adds that each Marauder clone is made so their minds will shut down if they attempt to betray Sinister.

The 1996 miniseries The Further Adventures of Cyclops and Phoenix revealed that Sinister hired a group of criminals known as the Marauders during the 19th century, making it retroactively the first incarnation of the group.

X-Men #200 (2007) featured the original Marauders team with several new members, including Omega Sentinel (possessed by Malice), Lady Mastermind, Sunfire, Gambit, and Mystique. The team worked alongside members of the Acolytes team. Following Sinister's apparent death during the crossover "Messiah Complex", many dormant Marauder clones awakened and fought the new X-Force team in X-Force vol. 3 #9. In Astonishing X-Men vol. 3 #48, a new version of the Marauders appeared whose members included: Arclight, Blockbuster, Harpoon, Prism, Vanisher, and Chimera (serving as the new leader). Mister Sinister later formed another incarnation of the Marauders team consisting of Aries, Azimuth, Chimera, and Coda. Several of the original Marauders (or at least their clones) were later confronted and killed by the mutant Chamber in The Uncanny X-Men vol. 2 #18 (2019).

The X-Men franchise titles were rebooted for the 2019 event Dawn of X. Professor X, Magneto, and the X-Men, along with many mutant allies and former enemies, created a new mutant community on the living island of Krakoa, a self-sufficient country where they offered sanctuary to any mutant who wished to join them. Various teleport gates were created across Earth to allow mutants (and only mutants) entry to Krakoa. Kitty Pryde then created a team to help transport those mutants whose native countries did not recognize Krakoa and/or blocked the local gates that would allow mutants to travel there. Kitty named this team the Marauders, and recruited the former X-Men Iceman, Storm, and Bishop, along with their old enemy Pyro (now reformed). The team appears in their own series Marauders, which started publication in 2019.

In the 2020 series Hellions, it was revealed that the original Marauders (except for Sabretooth and Scalphunter) refused to join the nation of Krakoa and had taken refuge in Nebraska, only to then be turned into zombie-like slaves of Madelyne Pryor.

Fictional team biography
In Victorian London, during the 1860s, Nathaniel Essex is a biologist and surgeon interested in evolution and the work of Charles Darwin. His interest becomes an obsession after the death of his son Adam due to multiple birth defects. Believing morality has no place in scientific research, Essex decides to experiment on humans to further his research into human genetics, hoping to one day create a perfect race. He meets the criminal Cootie Tremble and his gang, the Marauders, and hired them. For years, the Marauders kidnap homeless and neglected people off the streets of London, bringing them to Essex's lab for his experiments. One test subject who survives is a man named Daniel Summers (an ancestor of the X-Man Scott Summers AKA Cyclops). During this time, Essex meets the Egyptian terrorist and cult leader En Sabah Nur, who might be the earliest example of a mutant on Earth, a person born with an X-gene that grants them superhuman powers and/or traits. Like Essex, En Sabah Nur (who will later be known as Apocalypse) believes in "survival of the fittest", though their methods and ultimate goals differ.

After his wife Rebecca discovers his work and condemns him, dying during labor soon afterward, Essex decides to leave behind his humanity. Using alien technology, Apocalypse turns Essex into an ageless superhuman with chalk-white skin. Essex takes on the name "Mister Sinister" (a reference to how his wife saw him before her death). Though he later cuts ties with the criminal Marauders before moving his operations to America, Sinister repeatedly decides to recruit other agents to act in his stead and serve as his protectors (which becomes more important to Essex after he decides he needs soldiers to use against Apocalypse).

In 1907, Sinister works at the Ravencroft Institute and temporarily employs the mutant killer Sabretooth as an agent. During World War II, Sinister works with the Nazi Dr. Josef Mengele. In 1944, John Greycrow of the US Army is executed by firing squad for murdering fellow officers. A mutant with the ability to regenerate from even potentially lethal wounds, Greycrow emerges from his grave and finds Mr. Sinister waiting. Sinister explains he learned of Greycrow's abilities and deadly nature and wishes to recruit him. Greycrow accepts, calling himself Scalphunter. Around this time, Sinister creates a clone of the Atlantean warrior Namor, the Sub-Mariner, calling it N2. After the clone is defeated by Captain America, and seeing that the Nazis will lose the war, Sinister and Greycrow leave to pursue their own agenda. Sinister's research during World War II is later recovered and used by the scientists behind the Weapon X project.

Sometime later during the Vietnam War, Scalphunter brings soldiers and civilians to Sinister for experimentation. Sabretooth, working as a mercenary, is hired to find the truth about the "White Devil" and his connection to reports of missing people, as well as the rumors of "monster men" appearing. Scalphunter tells Sabretooth to leave him and Sinister alone, offering money and teasing that he will let the authorities know the mercenary has been killing prostitutes during his investigation. Sabretooth agrees to leave with the money and Scalphunter indicates that he and Sinister will recruit him in the future.

Many years later, a version of the mutant scientist Hank McCoy arrives on Earth from another timeline where Apocalypse rules. This version of McCoy, called the Dark Beast, is an amoral student and lab assistant of his timeline's version of Sinister. Journeying to New York City, he experiments on several mutants, using the techniques Sinister taught him, in order to see how much he can change or enhance mutation. Several of his surviving test subjects decide to hide from the world, joining the underground community known as the Morlocks. Years later, Dark Beast's experiments indirectly lead to the "Mutant Massacre."

Becoming aware of the mutant teenagers Scott Summers and Jean Grey, Sinister concludes that their combined genetic codes could create a near-perfect mutant, one powerful enough to destroy Apocalypse. Since Jean Grey is already being mentored and watched over by the powerful telepath Professor Charles Xavier, Sinister spends years focusing much of his efforts on manipulating Scott Summers. To aid in this, Sinister brings the orphaned Scott to the Essex State Home for Foundlings in Nebraska, an orphanage he secretly runs and uses to monitor and experiment on mutant children. Eventually, Scott leaves the orphanage and is also recruited by Xavier. However, Sinister retrieves cell samples from them and begins working on perfecting his cloning process. When Scott and Jean become founding members of Xavier's counter-terrorist strike force, the X-Men, Sinister decides to obtain fresh DNA samples from all of them. Rather than use Scalphunter or Sabretooth, he hires Kraven the Hunter and the Blob to get the job done.

Forming the first Marauders team 
Years after joining the X-Men, Jean Grey joins with the powerful Phoenix Force. After months of wielding her new cosmic power, Jean is temporarily corrupted, causing the Phoenix Force to warp into a new, murderous persona called Dark Phoenix. To prevent the Dark Phoenix from causing harm, Jean seemingly kills herself. Her death inadvertently activates Sinister's clone of Jean Grey and he decides to use it to further manipulate Cyclops. Named "Madelyne Pryor," the clone encounters Cyclops, and the two fall in love. After marrying and having a child, Nathan Summers, they move to Alaska.

Meanwhile, Sinister decides that the sewer-dwelling mutant community known as the Morlocks represents the worst kind of mutants possible and should not be allowed to risk mixing with the gene pool of other mutants and humans. He is further angered when his studies reveal that several Morlocks bear signs of genetic manipulation based on his own research (due to the fact that many of them were experimented on by Dark Beast). Disgusted that someone has used his "signature" without his permission, Sinister decides to wipe out the Morlocks living in Manhattan's sewers. He hires the mutant thief Gambit to recruit a team of warriors and assassins who will work with Sabretooth and Scalphunter. In exchange, he performs surgery on Gambit to correct a defect that would have ensured the mutant thief would one day lose control of his powers. Recalling the criminals he worked with in London, Mr. Sinister decides to christen his first official team of agents "the Marauders."

Before Sinister sends his Marauders against the Morlocks, Jean Grey is discovered alive and well by the Avengers. Her former X-Men comrades are contacted and a shocked Scott Summers leaves Alaska to see for himself that it's actually her. Rather than return home to his wife and child, Scott remains with his old teammates as they form a new team called X-Factor. It is later said this is because Sinister uses his mental influence over Cyclops to encourage him to leave behind Madelyne and Nathan, making them easy targets. With Cyclops gone, Sinister sends his newly formed Marauders to attack the now undefended Summers house in Alaska. The Marauders kidnap Nathan, leaving Maddie injured and near-death. Unbeknownst to Sinister, she survives the ordeal, is taken to a hospital and slips into a coma.

"Mutant Massacre" and "Inferno" 
Returning to New York, the Marauders are sent after the Morlocks. Using his stealth and tracking skills, Gambit leads the group to the secret Morlock community in the sewers but abandons the group when he learns they intend to murder the people living there. The Marauders dismiss Gambit and begin their slaughter, causing the "Mutant Massacre" event, a series of battles that include the X-Men, X-Factor, and other heroes such as Thor. During the fighting, the Marauders Prism,<ref>'X-Factor #10 (1987. Marvel Comics)</ref> Riptide, and Blockbuster are killed in action. However, Sinister has now perfected his cloning techniques and simply recreates them. He also uses his scientific skill and mental abilities to ensure that the minds of the Marauder clones will shut down if they decide to betray him.

Following the "Mutant Massacre", the remaining Marauders attack the X-Men's base at the Xavier School for Gifted Youngsters (also known as the X-Mansion) in Westchester, New York. Scanning the mind of Sabretooth, the X-Man called Psylocke learns the massacre was ordered by someone called "Sinister", alerting the X-Men to his presence for the first time. The attack fails, but the Marauders later attack former X-Men member Polaris. Malice succeeds in possessing her mind and then becomes the field leader of the team. After it was discovered that Madelyne Pryor was alive and recovered, the Marauders tried and failed to assassinate her. She rejoined the company of the X-Men, traumatized by the loss of her son and convinced Cyclops had abandoned them.

Maddie's resentment and anger start to corrupt her, leading her to make a deal with demons. Transformed into the demonically powered "Goblyn Queen," Madelyne is at the heart of the "Inferno" crossover as Hell-bound forces cross into Earth's dimensions. During this time, the Mauraders face Madelyne again, now joined by Sinister who reveals her true origin as a clone. Many of the Marauders are killed during "Inferno," and Maddie later dies herself, her life force and memories merging with those of Jean Grey. Sinister confronts the X-Men and X-Factor teams, revealing how he manipulated both Maddie and Cyclops. Cyclops unleashes a powerful optic blast that seemingly kills Sinister, leaving only bones. This is later revealed to be a ruse performed by Mr. Sinister, who decided it was best to retreat. Without Sinister, the Marauders Sabretooth, Blockbuster, and Malice continue their own attacks on the X-Men. Not long afterward, Sinister appears again, now with a new group called the Nasty Boys. In later adventures, Sinister works with the Marauders again rather than the Nasty Boys, though at times the group seems to follow its own agenda.

In the alternate reality called "Age of Apocalypse," the native version of Sinister uses DNA from Jean Grey and Scott Summers to create a powerful mutant called Nate Grey. After Nate transports to the mainstream Marvel reality and makes a home there, Sinister's agent Threnody befriends him. When she refuses to work for Sinister further, he sends the Marauders and they battle Nate Grey. Using his telepathy, Nate causes Arclight to kill Blockbuster, then manipulates Riptide to kill Arclight. It is soon after this that Gambit discovers Sinister keeps clones of all the Marauders, ready in the event of their deaths. He rarely attempts to clone Sabretooth, whose healing abilities and feral nature make even his clones resistant to mental control.

 Later teams 
A new incarnation of the team emerges years later, consisting of  Malice (now possessing Omega Sentinel). Lady Mastermind, Sunfire, Gambit, and Mystique, who have all aligned themselves with the former Acolytes known as Exodus, Random, Frenzy, Tempo, and Unuscione. The team is sent after a list of mutants, many of whom are native to alternate timelines and possible future eras. During this assignment, the team kills Vargas and Dark Mother, and destroys Wohnhaus Strucker, a building with ties to the future. They seemingly kill the mutant teleporter Gateway and the time traveler Cable (a grown-up version of Nathan Summers), but both later turn up alive. Though they try to kill Blindfold, she escapes. The Marauders also seek out the diaries of the dead psychic mutant Destiny, but the books in the X-Mansion are destroyed.

The Marauders play a major role in X-Men: Messiah Complex, sent by Sinister to track down the first mutant child born after "M-Day," an event that stripped most mutants of their X-genes and powers. During a battle on Muir Island, the Marauders Scrambler and Vertigo seemingly die. Mr. Sinister is killed by Mystique, but is able to transfer his consciousness into a host before then growing a new clone body for himself.

Following Sinister's apparent death, a  large contingent of Marauder clones awaken and fight the newest team called X-Force, a black ops team. Nearly all the clones are killed.

Da'o Coy Manh, the half-sister of the mutant known as Karma, forms a new incarnation of the Marauders in order to take revenge on her father. The new lineup includes: Arclight, Blockbuster, Harpoon, Prism, and Vanisher, with Chimera as the apparent new leader.

 Magneto's Marauders 
With the exceptions of Malice and Sabretooth, many clones of the other Marauders still exist. Deciding they are long overdue for vengeance in the name of the Morlocks their predecessors killed, Magneto hunts down and kills these clones, except for one of Scalphunter, whose limbs are dismembered. After tracking a group of remaining clones that have yet to be activated, Magneto decides instead to alter their personalities to obey his own commands in the future.

Following World War Hate, Magneto leads various mutants through the island of Genosha. Magneto later unleashes his loyal Marauder clones against the international intelligence agency S.H.I.E.L.D., using them as a distraction while he destroys much of the organization's collected data on mutants. Magneto and his Marauders then retreat and go separate ways. Magneto kills the Sabretooth clone when he realizes its feral nature and healing abilities make it resistant to his mental loyalty programming. He and the Marauders apparently part ways later on.

 All-New, All-Different Marvel 
As part of the All-New, All-Different Marvel event, Mister Sinister forms another incarnation of the Marauders in order to capture Nightcrawler. This team includes Aries, Azimuth, Chimera, and Coda.

After being manipulated by Emma Frost, the Marauders reform with Scalphunter, Arclight, Harpoon, Blockbuster, Vertigo, and Malice. The X-Men confronts this group, accusing them of committing a second Morlock Massacre. The Marauders deny this charge, but the X-Man Chamber burns them alive with his psionic flame. As he burns, Harpoon impales Chamber in the back, killing the young mutant.

 Dawn of X 
In the 2019 Dawn of X event, Xavier and Magneto work with the X-Men, as well as many allies and former enemies, to create a new mutant nation and sanctuary on the living island of Krakoa. Krakoa creates teleport gates around the Earth so that mutants (and only mutants) may be able to travel to its land instantaneously and join the new community. However, some countries do not recognize the sovereignty of Krakoa and block their local gates in order to prevent their own mutant citizens from leaving. To aid these mutants who cannot access the gates, Kitty Pryde forms a new group she calls the Marauders, recruiting her now reformed enemy Pyro as well as former teammates Storm, Iceman, and Bishop. 

Mister Sinister, Scalphunter, and Sabretooth join the Krakoa community. The other living former Marauders refuse to come to Krakoa, taking shelter in Sinister's former orphanage base in Nebraska. While Sinister is left alone due to now being a member of Krakoa's ruling Quiet Council, Scalphunter is confronted by Morlocks on the island who inform him it is the anniversary of the Mutant Massacre. Rather than seek to make amends, Scalphunter remorselessly answers with violence and reveals a hidden weapon. He is later grouped with other mutants who are having trouble fitting in with the new community due to aggressive, violent, or villainous attitudes. At Sinister's suggestion, the group becomes a new team of Hellions whom he hopes to rehabilitate through a form of group therapy. The former X-Men member Psylocke joins Sinister as overseer of the group.

For their first mission, the new Hellions go to Sinister's orphanage in order to confront the original Marauders, only to learn they have become zombie-like beings under the control of Madelyne Pryor.

Members
Original roster

Second roster

During the Messiah Complex storyline, five former X-Men joined the original roster of the Marauders, and Sabretooth was not among the group.

 Gambit (Remy LeBeau): Before joining the X-Men, Gambit was hired by Sinister to assemble the Marauders. Feeling responsible for the deaths of hundreds of Morlocks, Gambit kept this a secret from the X-Men until Rogue absorbed his memories and found out Gambit's secret. His brainwashing by Apocalypse and manipulation by Sinister led him to abandon the X-Men, though he has since returned to the team.
 Lady Mastermind (Regan Wyngarde): An illusion-creating mutant and one of Jason Wyngarde's (the original Mastermind) daughters.
 Mystique: A shapeshifter, mother of Nightcrawler and the adoptive mother of Rogue. She infiltrated the X-Men in order to betray them from within.
 Sunfire (Shiro Yoshida): A Japanese mutant and former X-Man with fire generation and manipulation abilities.
 Omega Sentinel (Karima Shapandar)
 Exodus (Bennet Du Paris)

Third roster
After the Schism storyline, two enemies of the X-Men joined the Marauders.

 Chimera: A former interdimensional pirate from an unknown Earth, who can generate dragon-shaped flares of greenish-transparent ectoplasmic energy to strike her enemies on various planes of being (i.e. physical, astral, etc.).
 Vanisher (Telford Porter): Longtime criminal and former member of the X-Force, he possesses the ability to teleport himself, his clothes, and an as yet undetermined amount of additional mass.

Fourth roster
Magneto eventually tracked the original Marauders' remaining clones, except for Sabretooth and Malice, and killed them all, which activated new clones of them. He prevented the activation of the clones and programmed them to deploy at his command in the future. Scalphunter was also spared, though his arms and legs were severed.

Fifth roster
As part of the All-New, All-Different Marvel event, Mister Sinister has formed another incarnation of the Marauders. Besides Chimera, this membership consisted of:

 Aries: A mutant with the horns and hindquarters of a ram. Aries has no connections with the Zodiac.
 Azimuth: A female mutant who can unhinge her jaws to form an oral singularity/black hole that can disrupt even Nightcrawler's teleportation.
 Coda: A mummified mutant with a forked tongue.

Miss Sinister's New Marauders
Following the rebirth of the Multiverse in the aftermath of Secret Wars, Miss Sinister had made her presence known and assembled several mutants that became stranded from the Ultimate Marvel into the Prime Universe which she personally handpicked and trained to be killers. Those among her New Marauders are:

 Jimmy Hudson: Rescued by the X-Men Blue team and defected the New Marauders.
 Guardian (Derek Morgan)
 Quicksilver
 Armor
 Mach-II (Nomi Blume)
 Malice

Miss Sinister kept experimenting on the New Marauders, granting them secondary mutations through a method called the "Mothervine". However, not all attempts were successful, with one of them resulting in Quicksilver's death. Pietro's body was left behind by Miss Sinister in her base once she abandoned it, and it was eventually found by the young X-Men while investigating, nevertheless the New Marauders remained by Miss Sinister's side as she allied herself with Havok, Emma Frost and Bastion to release "Mothervine" globally with the intent to make mutantkind the dominant species. Miss Sinister later attempted to recruit the time-displaced Jean Grey to their cause by making sure she would find a necklace which unbeknownst to her, contained the essence of Malice. However, due to Jean's strong defenses, Malice could not bring herself to possess Jean, instead she was eventually found by Polaris which she immediately possessed. However, because Polaris had already been possessed by Malice, she was able to free herself from the possession, breaking Malice's necklace in the process. Miss Sinister also sent the New Marauders to recruit Xorn to Havok's cause, but Jimmy Hudson and Bloodstorm, intervened and rescued him. Shortly afterwards, the New Marauders were sent to attack Magneto, who had threatened Havok's plans but the master of magnetism evaded them and escaped using his time platform. Following the capture of the young X-Men, Emma Frost finally rejected Miss Sinister's ideal and psychically controlled Mach-II, Armor and Guardian in order to turned them upon their mistress, however, Miss Sinister activated a kill-switch she had implanted in their genetic code, which killed instantly all three.

X-Men team

Other versions

Age of Apocalypse
In the Age of Apocalypse storyline, the Marauders are a band of human terrorists equipped with wrist-armories and air-steppers, serving Apocalypse and consisting of Arcade, Dirigible, the Owl and Red. The group was sent by Apocalypse to destroy the land of Wakanda where Arcade was able to murder Black Panther and together destroy much of the land, the Marauders' life was cut short by Clint Barton and Gwen Stacy.

House of M
In the House of M reality, the Marauders are a covert ops group led by Callisto and consisting of Banshee, Black Tom Cassidy, Blob, Caliban, Mammomax, Sunder, and T-Rex.

Mutant X
In the Mutant X dimension, a group of thieves calling themselves the Marauders are made up of mostly X-Force and Generation X associates, such as an overweight Cannonball, Jubilee, Husk, Sunspot and Wolfsbane.

Ultimate Marvel
In the Ultimate Marvel universe, the Marauders appear in the Ultimate X-Men series and are a white supremacist group led by Arnim Zola.

What If?
The Marauders are featured in What If? vol. 2 #101.

In other media
Television
The Marauders appear in the Wolverine and the X-Men animated series, consisting of Mister Sinister, Arclight, Blockbuster, Harpoon, Multiple Man, and Vertigo. Like the comics, they collect Mutant DNA by force for Sinister's plans to create the "Ultimate Mutant". In the episode "eXcessive Force" however, Cyclops disrupts one of their missions while searching for the missing Jean Grey, whom he believes Sinister kidnapped. In the episode "Guardian Angel", Sinister transforms the Angel into Archangel after the latter loses his wings. In the episode "Shades of Grey", Archangel joins the Marauders on a mission in which they are temporarily captured, but later escape. It is also revealed that the Marauders are in league with Apocalypse.

Video games
 The Marauders appear in the Deadpool video game, consisting of Mister Sinister, Vertigo, Blockbuster, and Arclight. After they cost Deadpool a bounty, he sets about killing them all one by one.
 The Marauders appear in the mobile game Marvel Strike Force'', consisting of Mystique, Mister Sinister, Sabretooth, and Stryfe.

References

External links
 
 Uncannyxmen.net feature on the Marauders
 

Characters created by Chris Claremont
Characters created by John Romita Jr.
Comics characters introduced in 1986
Fictional assassins in comics
Fictional mass murderers
Fictional mercenaries in comics
Marvel Comics supervillain teams
X-Men supporting characters